The 56th season of the Professional Bowlers Association (PBA) Tour was played in 2015. There were 27 singles title events, three doubles title events, and two team events on the 2015 schedule.

Tournament schedule and recaps
For the seventh year in a row, the PBA held multiple fall North American events in one location, at the GEICO PBA World Series of Bowling VII (WSOB VII).  Preliminary rounds and match play took place December 8 through December 14 in Reno, NV, and included four "animal" oil pattern events (Cheetah, Viper, Chameleon and Scorpion). The four pattern tournaments in WSOB VII served as initial qualifying for the PBA World Championship. The top 25% of players in total pinfall (from a field of up to 312 participants) over the 36 games of qualifying (nine games per pattern tournament) moved on to the PBA World Championship cashers round, and bowled an additional six games of qualifying on the PBA World Championship oil pattern to determine the top 24. Three additional match play rounds of eight games each determined the field for the five-player stepladder finals, which aired live in primetime on December 17 on ESPN. The finals for the four animal pattern tournaments were taped on December 18, and aired on consecutive Sundays on ESPN, beginning December 20.

Several international tour stops, which are part of the World Bowling Tour (WBT), were again part of the PBA schedule. As in 2014, a PBA title was awarded if any of these stops were won by a PBA member.  In addition, some tournaments formerly consigned as PBA Regional tour stops qualified the winner to earn a PBA title. These are designated as "Xtra Frame" tournaments, because they are broadcast exclusively (start-to-finish) on the PBA's Xtra Frame webcast service.

Returning to the PBA schedule in 2015 was the U.S. Open major, which was not played in 2014. The BPAA and USBC secured Bowlmor AMF bowling centers as the title sponsor for the 2015 event, which took place November 2–8 in Garland, Texas.

Season highlights
 Jason Belmonte, reigning 2012–13 and 2014 PBA Player of the Year, continued his stunning run of dominance in PBA majors. On February 8, he won the USBC Masters for an unprecedented third straight season. Only Mike Aulby has also won the Masters three times, but Aulby's wins were not in consecutive seasons. The following week, Belmonte also won the Barbasol Tournament of Champions for the second straight season.  This marked Belmonte's tenth appearance in the TV finals over the last 12 majors, and his fifth major tournament win.
 Also at the Barbasol Tournament of Champions, Sean Rash made history when he rolled the PBA's 25th televised perfect 300 game in the second match of the finals. Having also shot the PBA's 23rd televised 300 game in the 2014 PBA Wolf Open, Rash is the only player in history with two perfect games in the TV finals of a PBA tournament. Chris Barnes, owner of the PBA's 22nd televised 300 game, rolled his second-ever perfect game in a PBA final at the DHC PBA Japan Invitational earlier this season, but that event was not televised in the U.S.
 The U.S. Open returned after a one-year hiatus, and was held November 2–8 in Garland, Texas. Ryan Ciminelli emerged as champion, earning his fourth PBA title and first major championship.
 Rookie Gary Faulkner Jr. was the surprise winner of the season's final major, the PBA World Championship held in December in Reno, NV. Faulkner, who rose from the #3 seed and defeated top seed E. J. Tackett in the final match, became just the second African American to win a PBA title and a PBA major, following George Branham III who won five titles between 1986 and 1996, including the 1993 Tournament of Champions.
 In an extremely close vote, Jason Belmonte was honored as the Chris Schenkel PBA Player of the Year for the third straight season, getting 47.36 percent of the vote over Ryan Ciminelli's 43.22 percent. Belmonte won two titles (both majors), led the PBA Tour in earnings, finished in the Top Five in nine other tournaments, and edged Ciminelli in Tour average (225.40 to 225.37). This makes Belmonte the fourth PBA player to earn three consecutive POY awards, following Earl Anthony (who did it twice), Mark Roth and Walter Ray Williams, Jr.  Runner-up Ciminelli was the only PBA player with three titles on the season (one being a major).  Jesper Svensson, a two-time winner in 2015, was named PBA Rookie of the Year.

Tournament summary
Below is a schedule of events for the 2015 PBA Tour season. Major tournaments are in bold. Career PBA title numbers for winners are shown in parenthesis (#).

C: broadcast on CBS Sports Network
E: broadcast on ESPN
X: broadcast on the PBA's Xtra Frame webcast service
[+] Chris Barnes won an additional ¥5 million ($43,032) for rolling a 300 game in his semifinal match.
[F] Denotes female competitor. By tournament rules, female competitors receive 8 pins handicap per game in this tournament, and thus cannot be credited with a PBA title.

References

External links
2015 PBA Season Schedule
2015 PBA International-WBT Season Schedule
2015 PBA TV Schedule

Professional Bowlers Association seasons
2015 in bowling